The synagogue in Velyki Mosty  in Ukraine, Lviv Oblast was built around 1900. It is now ruined.

History 
By the time the synagogue was built there was another synagogue - the old synagogue - nearby. This was ruined during World War I and later disassembled. The new synagogue, which by this time was not completely finished, was partially destroyed but was repaired after the war. During World War II, the Germans burned alive many local Jews in the building. After the war a new roof was installed on the building and it was used as a storage for cattle bones. In the 1950s a storm threw down the whole roof of the main hall and was never replaced. Afterwards the storage was taken away and since then the building stands without any function and deteriorates more and more.

Architecture 
The synagogue is a brick building and consists of the main hall and a narrower and lower narthex. To the north of the synagogue is a one-storied building that is thought to have been the Jewish bath-house (Mikveh). The main hall is nearly square (16 × 16 m) and almost 8 m high; the narthex measures roughly 8 × 16 m. The inside of the main hall is divided by 4 square arches into 9 bays.

See also 
 List of synagogues in Ukraine

References 

Synagogues in Ukraine
Former synagogues in Ukraine